The men's 73 kg Judo competitions at the 2014 Commonwealth Games in Glasgow, Scotland was held on 25 July at the Scottish Exhibition and Conference Centre. Judo returned to the program, after last being competed back in 2002.

Results

Finals

Repechages

Top half

Bottom half

References

M73
2014